Augusto de Muro (? – 1959) was an Argentine chess player and organizer.

He was the president of the Argentine Chess Federation and the head of the Organizing Committee for the 8th Chess Olympiad which took place at Buenos Aires from August 21 to September 19, 1939. When World War II began, de Muro, along with team captains – leading roles were played by Alexander Alekhine, Savielly Tartakower, and Albert Becker – decided to continue with the Olympiad. He was elected an Honorary Member of the FIDE in 1939.

References

1959 deaths
Argentine chess players
Chess officials
Year of birth missing